Jonathan Johansson (born August 29, 1980) is a Swedish musician and singer-songwriter from Malmö.  He is currently signed to Hybris Records.

Pitchfork describes his music as containing "the bruised emotionalism and chilly synthcraft of his Swedish language debut, En hand i himlen ("A Hand in Heaven/the sky").

His single "Aldrig Ensam" was remixed by Swedish electronic act Boeoes Kaelstigen.

Discography

Albums

Singles

Notes

References

External links

Official website
MySpace.com
PitchFork.com

1980 births
Living people
Swedish male musicians
Swedish-language singers